Ben-Hur or Ben Hur may refer to:

Fiction
Ben-Hur: A Tale of the Christ, an 1880 novel by American general and author Lew Wallace
 Ben-Hur (play), a play that debuted on Broadway in 1899 
 Ben Hur (1907 film), a one-reel silent film adaptation produced by Kalem Studios of New York
 Ben-Hur (1925 film), an MGM silent film adaptation starring Ramon Novarro
 Ben-Hur (1959 film), an MGM sound film adaptation starring Charlton Heston; winner of eleven Academy Awards
 Ben Hur (2003 film), an animated direct-to-video film adaptation featuring the voice of Charlton Heston
 Ben Hur (miniseries), a television miniseries that aired in 2010
 Ben-Hur (2016 film), directed by Timur Bekmambetov and starring Jack Huston
 Judah Ben-Hur, the main character of the novel and adaptations

People
 Ben-Hur Baz (1906–2003), a Mexican painter of pin-up art
 Ben-Hur (footballer) (born 1977), a Brazilian football midfielder
 Benhur Salimbangon (born 1945), a Filipino politician
 Ben Hur Villanueva (1938–2020), a Filipino sculptor

Places
 Ben Hur, Arkansas, an unincorporated community in Newton County, Arkansas
 Ben Hur, California, an unincorporated community in Mariposa County, California
 Ben Hur, Texas, a town
 Ben-Hur, a settlement in the district capital of the Kalahari Constituency, Namibia
 Ben Hur, Virginia, an unincorporated community in Lee County, Virginia

Other uses
Ben Hur (album), an album by Bitch Magnet
 Ben-Hur Museum, renamed the General Lew Wallace Study and Museum
 Club Sportivo Ben Hur, a sports club in Argentina
 Ben Hur (automobile), an early car
 Ben Hur trailer, a nickname for the World War II G-518 one-ton U.S. Army trailer
 Tribe of Ben-Hur, an authorized fraternal order based on the book, later an insurance company
 Paradelta Ben Hur, an Italian paraglider design

See also
 Ben Huh, South-Korean-American internet entrepreneur
 Hur (Bible)